The following lists events that happened during 1927 in the Belgian Congo.

Incumbents

 Governor General – Martin Rutten, then Auguste Tilkens

Events

See also

 Belgian Congo
 History of the Democratic Republic of the Congo

References

Sources

 
Belgian Congo
Belgian Congo